The 31st running of the Emakumeen Euskal Bira was held from 19 to 22 May 2018. Raced over four stages in the Basque Country, it was one of two women's cycling events at World Tour level in Spain, together with La Madrid Challenge. It was the 12th event of the 2018 UCI Women's World Tour.

Schedule

Leadership classification

See also
 2018 in women's road cycling

References

2018
2018 UCI Women's World Tour
2018 in Spanish road cycling
Emakumeen Euskal Bira